Bassirou Ouédraogo is a Burkina Faso professional footballer who plays as a forward for Horoya AC and the Burkina Faso national football team.

International career
In January 2014, coach Brama Traore, invited him to be a part of the Burkina Faso squad for the 2014 African Nations Championship. The team was eliminated in the group stages after losing to  Uganda and Zimbabwe and then drawing with Morocco.

International goals
Scores and results list Burkina Faso's goal tally first.

References

Living people
Burkinabé footballers
2014 African Nations Championship players
Burkina Faso A' international footballers
1992 births
Association football forwards
Burkina Faso international footballers
21st-century Burkinabé people
Burkinabé expatriate sportspeople in Gabon
Burkinabé expatriate sportspeople in Guinea
Horoya AC players
CF Mounana players
ASFA Yennenga players
Burkinabé expatriate footballers
Expatriate footballers in Gabon
Expatriate footballers in Guinea